Cleistocactus hyalacanthus is a species of columnar cacti in the genus Cleistocactus. The name comes from the Greek kleistos meaning closed because the flowers hardly open.

Description
Cleistocactus hyalacanthus flowers sprout from the center of needle clusters.  They first appear as small dark spots, which gradually enlarge over a week or ten days into long red flowers, each of which is only open, and only slightly, for one day.  They are food for hummingbirds, which are attracted by the vivid red color.  Those flowers that have been fertilized will develop a fruit which is 1 cm in diameter.  The fruits eventually turn yellow when they are ripe.  They are food for larger birds, which disperse the small black seeds in their droppings.

References

External links

Trichocereeae
Cacti of South America
Flora of Argentina
Flora of Bolivia
Flora of Peru
Flora of Uruguay